Pura Dalem Segara Madhu also known as Pura Dalem Jagaraga is a northern Balinese Hindu temple or pura located in the village of Jagaraga, Buleleng in northern Bali. It is about 11 km east of Singaraja. The village of Jagaraga is known historically as the place where the Dutch colonial government witnesses puputan or Balinese mass-suicide following their military attack on the kingdom of Bali in 1849. Pura Dalem Segara Madhu is known for its intensive wall decoration typical of northern Balinese architecture and for its unique western-influenced relief e.g. motifs of early 20th-century airplanes and automobiles.

History

The establishment of Pura Dalem Segara Madhu was estimated in the 12th century by Raja Sri Aji Jayaraga. During the Dutch intervention of Bali in 1849, the entire palace and temple complex were destroyed by the Dutch military. The rebuilt of the pura began in 1865, the building that still stands today. The pura was designed as a combination of Pura Prajapati and Pura Dalem, each dedicated to Durga and Shiva. The combination of both temples is possible because the deities are still one family.

Northern Balinese style

Typical of northern Balinese temple, Pura Dalem Segara Madhu is carved more ornately than its southern counterpart. Pura Dalem Jagaraga is carved with depictions of foliage, flowers, nagas, and human figures; a type of carvings that can be found in other northern Balinese pura e.g. Pura Beji Sangsit.

Pura Dalem Segara Madhu is one of a few temples in Bali with carvings that depict the western world. Carvings in the perimeter wall of the temple feature unusual 20th-century figures e.g. carving of an airplane falling into the sea, carving of a ship attacked by a sea monster, and carving of an early 20th-century automobile. The carvings depicting the western world can also be found in other northern Balinese pura e.g. Pura Meduwe Karang and Pura Beji Sangsit, indicating contact with the western world in northern Bali. The Dutch colonial government entered Bali through the north. This entry is followed with several conflicts between the Dutch colonial government and the Balinese kingdom. In the mid-19th-century, the Dutch government conducted a series of campaigns to impose its colonial rule on the kingdom of Bali. The last campaign occurred two times in the early 20th-century which caused the death of 1000 Balinese civilians and the raze of a kingdom. The massacre shocked the West where the disproportion between the offense and harshness of the punitive actions was pointed out. Image of the Netherlands as a benevolent and responsible colonial power was seriously affected as a consequence. The Netherlands, also under criticism for their policies in Java, Sumatra and the eastern island, decided to make amends, and announced the establishment of an "Ethical policy". As a consequence, the Dutch in Bali turned students and protectors of Balinese culture and endeavored to preserve it in addition to their initial modernization role. Efforts were made at preserving Bali culture and at making it a "living museum" of classical culture, and in 1914, Bali was opened to tourism.

Temple compound

Pura Dalem Segara Madhu is divided into three areas: the outer sanctum of the temple ( or ), the middle sanctum ( or ), and the inner main sanctum ( or ).

Access to the middle sanctum is provided by a  gate carved with intricately in northern Balinese style. The  features monstrous Bhoma head on top of the portal. The middle sanctum is where several Balinese pavilions i.e.

See also

Balinese temple

References

Cited works

Balinese temples
Hindu temples in Indonesia